Tangalle Urban Council (TUC) is the local authority for the town of Tangalle in the Hambantota District, Southern Province, Sri Lanka. The TUC is responsible for providing a variety of local public services including roads, sanitation, drains, housing, libraries, public parks and recreational facilities. It has 9 councillors elected using an open list proportional representation system.

Election results

2018 local government election

Results of the local government election held on 10 February 2018

2011 local government election
Results of the local government election held on 17 March 2011:

2006 local government election

2002 local government election

Results of the local government election held on 20 May 2002

References

Government of Hambantota District
Local authorities in Southern Province, Sri Lanka
Urban councils of Sri Lanka